Abyssinia is a historical name for the Ethiopian Empire.

Abyssinia may also refer to:

Arts and media 
Abyssinia, a theatrical show by Bert Williams
 Abyssinia (musical), a show first staged in 1987
 "Abyssinia", a song by the Patti Smith Group on Radio Ethiopia
 "Abyssinia, Henry", an episode of the television series M*A*S*H

Languages
Abyssinian languages, family of languages spoken in Ethiopia, Eritrea, and Sudan

People
Abyssinian peoples, ethnic or pan-ethnic identifier used to refer to Ethiopians and Eritreans

Places 
 Abyssinia Lines, a neighbourhood of Jamshed Town in Karachi, Sindh, Pakistan
 Apostolic Vicariate of Abyssinia, the former Eastern Catholic missionary

Vessels 
 HMS Abyssinia (1870), a British armoured ship
 SS Abyssinia, an 1870 Canadian Pacific steamship

Other uses 
 Abyssinia (battle honour)
 Abyssinia Creek, The Pilbara, Western Australia

See also 
 
 Abyssinian (disambiguation)
 Habash (disambiguation)
 Habishi (disambiguation)
 History of Ethiopia